Brett David Sinkinson (born 30 December 1971) is a New Zealand born rugby union player who played for the Wales national rugby union team. A flanker, he was known for his mobility and hard tackling. He never played for New Zealand.

After representing Wales it was discovered that he was ineligible to play for Wales when he revealed his grandfather Sydney Sinkinson was born in Oldham in England instead of Carmarthen in Wales as had previously been indicated by him. The scandal that followed was termed "grannygate". Sinkinson was barred from playing for Wales but later returned to the Wales team after legally qualifying through the residency rules.

Sinkinson now resides in his home country New Zealand with his wife Tracey and his two children.

References

External links
 Wales profile

New Zealand rugby union players
Wales international rugby union players
1971 births
Rugby union flankers
Neath RFC players
Living people
People educated at Whakatane High School
New Zealand people of English descent
New Zealand expatriate sportspeople in Wales